Nanakmatta Legislative Assembly constituency is one of the 70 Legislative Assembly constituencies of Uttarakhand state in India. It was formed in 2012 after being split from Khatima Constituency.

It is part of Udham Singh Nagar district and is reserved for candidates belonging to the Scheduled tribes.

Members of the Legislative Assembly

Election results

2022

2017

See also
 List of constituencies of the Uttarakhand Legislative Assembly
 Udham Singh Nagar district

References

External links
  

Udham Singh Nagar district
Assembly constituencies of Uttarakhand